Robert Tannahill (29 March 1870 – 1950) was a Scottish footballer who played in the Football League for Bolton Wanderers and Chesterfield.

References

1870 births
1950 deaths
Scottish footballers
English Football League players
Association football forwards
Kilmarnock F.C. players
Blackburn Rovers F.C. players
Bolton Wanderers F.C. players
Tottenham Hotspur F.C. players
Millwall F.C. players
Chesterfield F.C. players
Fulham F.C. players
Grays United F.C. players
Oldham Athletic A.F.C. players
FA Cup Final players